Mowrystown is a village in Highland County, Ohio, United States. The population was 360 at the 2010 census.

History
Mowrystown was laid out in 1829, and named after Abe Mowry, an early settler.

Geography
Mowrystown is located at  (39.038827, -83.752457).

Demographics

2010 census
As of the census of 2010, there were 360 people, 129 households, and 92 families living in the village. The racial makeup of the village was 99.7% White and 0.3% from two or more races.

There were 129 households, of which 38.0% had children under the age of 18 living with them, 46.5% were married couples living together, 17.8% had a female householder with no husband present, 7.0% had a male householder with no wife present, and 28.7% were non-families. 23.3% of all households were made up of individuals, and 12.4% had someone living alone who was 65 years of age or older. The average household size was 2.79 and the average family size was 3.27.

The median age in the village was 34.8 years. 28.1% of residents were under the age of 18; 7.5% were between the ages of 18 and 24; 27.6% were from 25 to 44; 21.9% were from 45 to 64; and 15% were 65 years of age or older. The gender makeup of the village was 50.6% male and 49.4% female.

2000 census
As of the census of 2000, there were 373 people, 143 households, and 103 families living in the village. The population density was 772.8 people per square mile (300.0/km2). There were 162 housing units at an average density of 335.6 per square mile (130.3/km2). The racial makeup of the village was 98.66% White, 0.80% Pacific Islander, and 0.54% from two or more races.

There were 143 households, out of which 37.8% had children under the age of 18 living with them, 55.2% were married couples living together, 11.9% had a female householder with no husband present, and 27.3% were non-families. 23.1% of all households were made up of individuals, and 8.4% had someone living alone who was 65 years of age or older. The average household size was 2.61 and the average family size was 3.12.

In the village, the population was spread out, with 28.2% under the age of 18, 10.5% from 18 to 24, 27.9% from 25 to 44, 22.5% from 45 to 64, and 11.0% who were 65 years of age or older. The median age was 34 years. For every 100 females there were 107.2 males. For every 100 females age 18 and over, there were 104.6 males.

The median income for a household in the village was $35,956, and the median income for a family was $37,917. Males had a median income of $31,250 versus $20,938 for females. The per capita income for the village was $13,884. About 11.6% of families and 10.1% of the population were below the poverty line, including 17.5% of those under age 18 and 18.8% of those age 65 or over.

Education
Mowrystown is the home of Whiteoak High School, home of the Whiteoak Wildcats.

References

Villages in Highland County, Ohio
Villages in Ohio